Douglas Milsome BSC, ASC (born 1939) is an English cinematographer. A former camera operator for John Alcott on films like A Clockwork Orange, Barry Lyndon, and The Shining, Milsome became a collaborator with director Stanley Kubrick following Alcott's death in 1986. His filmography includes numerous genre films including Robin Hood: Prince of Thieves, Highlander: Endgame, Dungeons & Dragons, and Dracula III: Legacy. He has also worked with Jean-Claude Van Damme on films such as Legionnaire and The Hard Corps.

Biography

Milsome was born in Hammersmith, London, England, in 1939.

Sometimes credited as Doug Milsome, perhaps his most-widely seen work is Robin Hood: Prince of Thieves. He collaborated with Stanley Kubrick and John Alcott in the 1970s, as camera operator and second-unit photographer, and became Kubrick's director of photography for Full Metal Jacket.  Known for his mastery of difficult focus techniques, tested especially with the idiosyncratic lenses used on Barry Lyndon to film scenes by candlelight, he was consulted for Kubrick's final project, Eyes Wide Shut.

Milsome has gravitated toward genres such as science fiction and fantasy, where he is known for his brooding style. He is member of both the American and British Societies of Cinematographers.

His son, Mark Milsome (1963–2017), was also a camera operator, and was killed during a shoot. At the inquest, the coroner ruled it an "accidental death".

Selected filmography

Cinematographer 

Full Metal Jacket (1987)
Hawks (1988)
The Beast of War (1989)
Lonesome Dove (1989)
Desperate Hours (1990)
If Looks Could Kill (1991)
Robin Hood: Prince of Thieves (1991)
Great Expectations (1991)
Sunset Grill (1993)
Body of Evidence (1993)
Seasons of the Heart (1994)
The Sunchaser (1996)
Legionnaire (1998)
Highlander: Endgame (2000)
Dungeons & Dragons (2000)
Dracula II: Ascension (2003)
Dracula III: Legacy (2005)
The Hard Corps (2006)
Until Death (2007)
Frenchy (2010)
Bitter Harvest (2017)

Camera Operator/Assistant 

The Guns of Navarone (1961)
The Curse of the Mummy's Tomb (1964)
A Clockwork Orange (1971)
Barry Lyndon (1975)
Seven Nights in Japan (1976)
Who Is Killing the Great Chefs of Europe? (1978)
The Shining (1980)
Ragtime (1981)
Yentl (1983)
A View to a Kill (1985)
Highlander (1986)
The Last of the Mohicans (1992)

References

External links
 Internet Encyclopedia of Cinematographers page
 

English cinematographers
Living people
1939 births
People from Hammersmith